At Home with the Snails is a surrealist BBC Radio 4 comedy, written by Gerard Foster, about a dysfunctional British family. The cast includes Geoffrey Palmer as George Fisher, Angela Thorne as Beverly Fisher, Gerard Foster as Alex, Miranda Hart as Rose, and Debra Stephenson as Hosanna. It was produced by Jane Berthoud.

At Home with the Snails is often repeated on BBC Radio 4 Extra.

The story features Alex's obsession with snails, killing them, collecting them, having sexual desires for them and by season two, even attempting to turn into one. In the second season his mother and father (George and Beverly) decide to fake their own deaths and spy on their son in order to write a book about his descent into madness.

George is a pompous academic who puts his obscure, pretentious and pointless pontificating above all else including his family. He encourages Alex's snail obsession to get material for his books. Beverly, his sexually frustrated wife makes "nice things", such as a  "family mug tree". In one episode she develops racial dysphoria, and starts painting her face with boot polish, believing that she is a black person trapped in a white body. Their daughter Rose has her heart in the wrong place - jammed under her armpit. She runs a confectionery shop selling "chocolate excretions" and "jelly war babies".

Episode list

References

External links

BBC Radio comedy programmes
Radio programs about families
2002 radio programme debuts
2003 radio programme endings